Lukács "Csucsu" Kornél (born 5 September 1991) is a Hungarian rally and rallycross driver. 

He competed for Wurmbrand Racing and Arrabona Rallye Club in the JWRC, EWRC and the Hungarian Rally Series events. His co-driver is Márk Mesterházi.

He currently competes in the FIA World Rallycross Championship with Speedy Motorsport in a Kia Rio.

Career

Early career 
Since his childhood he has participated in racing competitions. Originally, he started his career as a motorcycle racer before switching to rallying. After participating several amateur competitions, he rapidly moved up to professional racing level.

At the age of 16 he started his amateur driver career by entering smaller events with a Suzuki Swift. In 2009 he and his co-driver Márk Mesterházi were driving rally sprints.

Professional rallying

2010 
In this season was Kornél's first professional year by entering the Hungarian Rally tour category driving a Honda Civic.

2011 
He was driving a Citroën C2 R2 Max. This year he entered the ERC category. His best race was the Hungarian IRC run, the Mecsek Rally where he gained the 2. place.

2012 
This season Kornél switched to Tatai Aréna Sportsclub. With a new Citroën C2 R2 he participated 3 ERC and 6 Hungarian Rally Series Events. On his debut event at the 47. Mogul Rallye Šumava Klatovy Csucsu along with Márk Mesterházi took rd place. This success was followed by 23. Waldviertel Rally, where he won the event in his category.

2013 
In 2013 he participated continuously rally events. He drove a Mitsubishi Lancer Evo IX in the Hungarian Rally Series and he entered 9 ERC events. He won the 56. Tour the Corse and finished 2nd in the overall standings in the ERC 2WD category.

2014 

In 2014 Kornél competed in the ERC with a Mitsubishi Lancer Evo IX and his first as a JWRC driver with the Wurmbrand Racing Team. He drove a Citroën DS3 R3T.

Results

Complete ERC results 
(key)

Ret = Retired

WRC results
(key)

WRC-3 results
(key)

JWRC results
(key)

Ret = Retired

Complete FIA European Rallycross Championship results
(key)

Supercar

* Season still in progress.

Complete FIA World Rallycross Championship results
(key)

Supercar

† Ten Championship points deducted for sealing an additional turbo after scrutineering.

Trainings 
2012 LRS London Rally School- UK
2012 2.CO-Driver Rally School – Huszárokelőpuszta, Hungary
2013 Tommi Mäkinen Racing School- Finland

Awards, Trophies 
2011: Award from the City Tata for the Exceptional talented Sportsman
2013: 2. Place in FIA ERC 2WD category

References

External links 

EWRC profile
Tatai Aréna SE sajtó anyagok

1991 births
Living people
Hungarian rally drivers
European Rallycross Championship drivers